The National Council on Public History (NCPH) is an American professional membership association established in 1979 to support a diverse group of people, institutions, agencies, businesses, and academic programs associated with the field of public history.

History
The National Council on Public History was established in 1979 as the professional organization of a growing movement advocating and practicing collaborative and interdisciplinary historical scholarship outside the boundaries of academia. With its emphasis on community engagement and activism, the term "public history" united people already practicing historical work outside of the classroom, including archivists, museum professionals, government historians and policy-makers, preservationists, oral historians, historical consultants, and more.

The organization was co-founded by historian Philip L. Cantelon and the formation of NCPH can be traced back to a 1978 public history conference in Phoenix, Arizona. Organized by G. Wesley Johnson of the University of California, Santa Barbara and funded by a grant from the Arizona Humanities Council, the conference's success resulted in the planning of the first national conference the following year.

In 1979, the first formal national meeting of public historians took place in Montecito, California, near the University of California, Santa Barbara, with funding support from the Rockefeller Foundation and the National Endowment for the Humanities. Out of the 1979 conference, a steering committee was set up to explore the formation of a professional organization. The steering committee met in Washington, D.C. on September 14, 1979, where they voted to create the National Council on Public History. NCPH was incorporated in the District of Columbia on May 2, 1980.

The current president of the association is Marla Miller. The NCPH Executive Office is located on the campus of Indiana University-Purdue University Indianapolis (IUPUI), and the current Executive Director is Stephanie Rowe. The association has partnered with a range of organizations and government agencies, including the National Coalition for History, Organization of American Historians, American Association for State and Local History, American Council of Learned Societies, National Park Service, and the U.S. Department of Education. The National Council on Public History's Annual Meeting is held every spring.

Publications
The National Council on Public History produces several print publications. In partnership with the Department of History at the University of California, Santa Barbara NCPH publishes a quarterly journal, The Public Historian.  NCPH also publishes a quarterly newsletter, Public History News, a listserv, H-Public, and a blog, History@Work. NCPH also produces digital resources for public historians, including Best Practices documents; The Public History Navigator, a guide for undergraduate history majors to the landscape of public history graduate programs; and the Guide to Public History Programs, a tool for cataloging and comparing graduate public history programs.

List of chairs 

 1980–83: G. Wesley Johnson, University of California, Santa Barbara
 1983–84: Larry Tise, Pennsylvania Historical and Museum Commission
 1984–85: Jack Holl, Department of Energy
 1985–86: Noel J. Stowe, Arizona State University
 1986–87: Michael Scardaville, University of South Carolina
 1987–88: Arnita A. Jones, History Associates, Inc.
 1988–89: Barbara Howe, West Virginia University
 1989–90: Theodore Karamanski, Loyola University of Chicago

List of presidents 

 1990–91: David Kyvig, University of Akron
 1991–92: Brit Allan Storey, Bureau of Reclamation, Denver
 1992–93: Martin V. Melosi, University of Houston
 1993–94: Philip V. Scarpino, Indiana University-Purdue University Indianapolis
 1994–95: Patricia Mooney-Melvin, Loyola University of Chicago
 1995–96: Jeffrey Brown, New Mexico State University
 1996–97: Diane Britton, University of Toledo 
 1997–98: Jannelle Warren Findley, Arizona State University
 1998–99: Dwight Pitcaithley, National Park Service
 1999–00: Michael J. Devine, American Heritage Center of Wyoming
 2000–01: Alan Newell, Historical Research Associates
 2001–02: Patrick O'Bannon, Historical Research Associates
 2002–03: Rebecca Conard, Middle Tennessee State University
 2003–04: James Gardner, National Museum of American History, Smithsonian Institution
 2004–05: Sharon Babaian, Canada Science and Technology Museum
 2005–06: Robert Weible, The State Museum of Pennsylvania
 2006–08: Bill Bryans, Oklahoma State University
 2008–10: Marianne Babal, Wells Fargo Bank
 2010–2012: Martin Blatt, National Park Service
 2012–2014: Robert Weyeneth, University of South Carolina
 2014–2016: Patrick Moore, University of West Florida
 2016–2018: Alexandra Lord, National Museum of American History 
 2018–2020: Marla Miller, University of Massachusetts Amherst
 2020-2022: Gregory Smoak, University of Utah

References

External links 

National Council on Public History
Public History Commons
Reflections on an Idea: NCPH’s First Decade by Barbara J. Howe, Chair's Annual Address, The Public Historian, Vol. 11, No. 3 (Summer 1989), pp. 69–85

History organizations based in the United States
Professional associations based in the United States
Non-profit organizations based in Indianapolis